Anthony Hancock may refer to:
Anthony Hancock (American football) (born 1960), former NFL wide receiver
Anthony Hancock (publisher) (1947–2012), British far-right publisher
Tony Hancock (1924–1968),  British comedian
Tony Hancock (footballer)

See also 
 Tony Hancox (1927–2017), English rower